The Francis Buttrick House is a historic house at 44 Harvard Street in Waltham, Massachusetts.  Built before 1852, it is one of a small number of temple-front Greek Revival houses in the city. It was listed on the National Register of Historic Places in 1989.

Description and history
The Francis Buttrick House stands in a densely built residential area west of downtown Waltham, on the east side of Harvard Street between Charles Street and Harvard Places.  It is a -story wood-frame structure, with a gabled roof and exterior clad in a variety of finishes.  Its principal distinguishing features is the massive two-story Greek Revival portico, with four fluted Doric Columns (one a modern replacement) supporting a full entablature and pedimented gable.  The front facade has full-height windows, with the main entrance in the leftmost of three bays.  A series of ells extend the building to the rear.

The house was built sometime before 1852; at the time of its listing on the National Register in 1989, it was one of four surviving temple-fronted houses in the city.  It was originally located a short way to the south, facing Charles Street, and was moved to its present location in the 1860s by Francis Buttrick, who apparently used it as a rental property.

See also
National Register of Historic Places listings in Waltham, Massachusetts

References

Houses on the National Register of Historic Places in Waltham, Massachusetts
Colonial Revival architecture in Massachusetts
Houses completed in 1874
Houses in Waltham, Massachusetts